Nevada football may refer to:

 Nevada Wolf Pack football, American Football of the University of Nevada, Reno (UNR)
 UNLV Rebels football, American Football of the University of Nevada, Las Vegas (UNLV)
 Las Vegas Bowl, NCAA division I-A postseason collegiate American football bowl game
 Las Vegas Posse, former Canadian Football team in the CFL
 Las Vegas Outlaws (XFL), former American Football team in the XFL
 Las Vegas Outlaws (arena football), former gridiron arena football team in the AFL
 Las Vegas Raiders, proposed team relocation of the American Football team in the NFL